Wayne White could refer to: 

Wayne White (artist) (born 1957), American artist, art director, puppeteer, set designer, animator, cartoonist and illustrator
Wayne White (cricketer) (born 1985), English former cricketer

See also
Randy Wayne White (born 1950), American crime fiction writer